is Japanese singer Ringo Sheena's 5th single and it was released on January 26, 2000, by Toshiba EMI / Virgin Music. The single was certified double platinum by the RIAJ for 800,000 copies shipped to stores and later gold for 100,000 downloads to cellphones in 2010.

Background 
Gips is taken from Sheena's second album Shōso Strip. Sheena was compelled to release two songs at the same time after all, she was going to release this song and Tsumi to Batsu separately first, though.
Hisako Tabuchi, the guitarist of Number Girl, plays the guitar on Σ.

The song was covered as a part of a medley by Rie Tomosaka on the television show The Yoru mo Hippare on September 9, 2000. It was also performed by Mino Kabasawa on her piano cover album Piano Pure: Memory of 2000 and by Kazumasa Oda on the TBS music program Christmas no Yakusoku 2002 on December 25, 2001. In 2009, it was covered by Marié Digby on her album Second Home and by Juju on her cover album Request. In 2012, it was released as a single by Ms. Ooja, and appeared on her album Woman: Love Song Covers.

Track listing

Chart rankings

Sales and certifications

Credits and personnel 
Gips
 Vocals: Ringo Sheena 
 Guitars: Susumu Nishikawa
 Bass guitars: Seiji Kameda
 Piano: Yuta Saito 
 Drums and Tambourines: Noriyasu "Kāsuke" Kawamura 
 Synthesizer programming: Nobuhiko Nakayama, Hiroshi Kitashiro

Tokyo no Hito
 Vocals, Electric guitars: Ringo Sheena 
 Electric guitars: Susumu Nishikawa 
 Bass guitars: Seiji Kameda 
 Drums: Masayuki Muraishi 
 Organ: Yuta Saito

Σ
 Vocals, Electric guitars: Ringo Sheena 
 Electric guitars: Hisako Tabuchi 
 Bass guitars: Seiji Kameda 
 Synthesizer programming: Nobuhiko Nakayama
 Turntables: moOog yamamOTO (from Buffalo Daughter)

Music video cast 
Gips
 Vocal & Electric guitar: Ringo Sheena 
 Electric guitar: Makoto Totani (from Milk Crown, Thinners)
 Electric bass guitar: Eikichi Iwai (from Chirinuruwowaka)
 Synthesizer, Keyboard instrument: Makoto Minagawa (from Thinners, Sparky)
 Drums: Hisashi Nishikawa (he is Sheena 's friend and is an amateur)

Σ
 Takeshi Hara
 Yuka Yoshimura
 Hisako Tabuchi
 Seiji Kameda

Notes 

Ringo Sheena songs
2000 songs
2000 singles
Songs written by Ringo Sheena
Song recordings produced by Seiji Kameda